Hoedillus is a genus of spiders in the family Zoropsidae. It was first described in 1898 by Simon. , it contains only one species, Hoedillus sexpunctatus, found in Guatemala and Nicaragua.

References

Zoropsidae
Monotypic Araneomorphae genera
Spiders of Central America